Friedrich Ruthardt (9 December 1802 – 23 May 1862) was a German oboist and composer. He played in the Stuttgart court orchestra, and composed chorales as well as pieces for the oboe and the zither. One of the best-known 19th-century oboe concertos, by Bernhard Molique, was likely written for Ruthardt, and first performed at Stuttgart in 1829.

Two of his sons were also musicians: Julius Ruthardt (1841–1909), a violinist; and Adolf Ruthardt (1849–1934), a music teacher and composer.

References

German classical oboists
Male oboists
1802 births
1862 deaths
19th-century German composers
19th-century male musicians